Fritz Amundsen (1 June 1902 – 22 February 1972) was a Norwegian footballer. He played in one match for the Norway national football team in 1930.

References

External links
 

1902 births
1972 deaths
Norwegian footballers
Norway international footballers
Association football defenders
Lyn Fotball players